Leandro Silva (born November 11, 1985) is a Brazilian professional mixed martial artist who competed in the lightweight and welterweight divisions of the Ultimate Fighting Championship.

Mixed martial arts career 
Silva began training in Muay Thai at the age of 20, transitioning to mixed martial arts a couple of years later. He compiled a professional record of 11–1–1 before signing with the UFC in May 2013.

Ultimate Fighting Championship 
Silva made his promotional debut as a short notice replacement against Ildemar Alcântara on June 8, 2013 at UFC on Fuel TV 10. Silva lost the fight via unanimous decision.

After a string of victories on the regional circuit, Silva returned to the UFC against Francisco Trinaldo on September 13, 2014 at UFC Fight Night 51.  Silva lost the fight via unanimous decision.

Silva next faced Charlie Brenneman on November 8, 2014 at UFC Fight Night 56. Silva defeated Brenneman via submission in the first round.

Silva faced Drew Dober on March 21, 2015 at UFC Fight Night 62.  Silva won the fight via technical submission in the second round. Silva was attempting to secure a guillotine choke after dropping to the mat with Dober's neck secured in his arm. Dober defended and moved his body to the side to stave off being caught in the choke. Silva appeared to be losing his grip on the submission as Dober continued to work free. However, the referee stepped in and touched the fighters as if to motion that he was standing them up. In reality, he was stopping the fight due to submission despite the fact that Dober never tapped and was in no significant danger of being choked out from the hold. The fight was later overturned to a no contest by the Brazilian MMA Athletic Commission (CABMMA) after the referee Eduardo Herdy admitted his mistake.

Silva faced promotional newcomer Lewis Gonzalez on June 27, 2015 at UFC Fight Night 70. Silva won the fight via unanimous decision.

Silva faced Efrain Escudero on November 21, 2015 at The Ultimate Fighter Latin America 2 Finale. Silva won the fight by unanimous decision.

Silva next faced Jason Saggo on June 18, 2016 at UFC Fight Night 89. Silva lost the fight via split decision.

Silva next faced Rustam Khabilov on September 3, 2016 at UFC Fight Night 93, replacing an injured Reza Madadi. Silva lost the fight by unanimous decision and was subsequently released from the promotion.

Post-UFC career
After being released, Silva signed with ACB and made his promotional debut against Pat Healy on January 13, 2017 at ACB 51: Silva vs. Torgeson. He won the fight via TKO in the first round.

Silva was expected to face Musa Khamanaev on 20 May, 2017 at ACB 61. But Khamanev pulled out from the event. 

Silva faced Joshua Aveleson July 23, 2017 at ACB 65. He lost the fight via unanimous decision.

Silva then faced Islam Makoev at ACB 73: Silva vs. Makoev on October 21, 2017. He won the fight via unanimous decision.

Silva faced Ali Bagov at ACB 80: Tumenov vs. Burrell on February 16, 2018. He lost the fight via unanimous decision.

Silva faced Paulo Goncalves Silva in the inaugural Kumite 1 League event on September 28, 2018. He won the fight via unanimous decision.

Silva faced Tilek Mashrapov at  Titan FC 52: Soares vs. Uruguai on January 25, 2019. He won the fight via second-round technical knockout.

Silva then faced Maxim Shvets at ProFC 65 on May 19, 2019. He lost the fight via unanimous decision.

Silva faced Robert Bryczek at OKTAGON 15 on November 9, 2019. He won the fight via unanimous decision.

Silva faced Alex Lohoré at OKTAGON 21 on January 30, 2021. He won the fight via split decision.

Silva faced David Kozma at OKTAGON 24 on May 29, 2021. He lost the fight via unanimous decision.

Silva, as a replacement for Micah Terrill, faced Magomed Umalatov on August 13, 2021 at PFL 7. At weigh-ins, Silva weighed in at  172.5 pounds, missing weight by 1.5 pounds. The bout proceeded at catchweight and he was fined 20% of his purse, which went to Umalatov. He lost the bout via unanimous decision.

Silva faced Bojan Veličković on October 15, 2022 at Oktagon 36. He won the bout via split decision.

Silva faced Andreas Michailidis on March 4, 2023 at Oktagon 40 in the Oktagon Welterweight Tournament Round of 16, losing the bout via unanimous decision.

Mixed martial arts record

|-
|Loss
|align=center|26–11–1 (1)
|Andreas Michailidis
|Decision (unanimous)
|OKTAGON 40
|
|align=center|3
|align=center|5:00
|Ostrava, Czech Republic
|
|-
|Win
|align=center|26–10–1 (1)
|Bojan Veličković
|Decision (split)
|OKTAGON 36
|
|align=center|3
|align=center|5:00
|Frankfurt, Germany
|
|-
|Loss
|align=center|
|Magomed Umalatov
|Decision (unanimous)
|PFL 7 
|
|align=center|3
|align=center|5:00
|Hollywood, Florida, United States
|
|-
|Loss
|align=center|25–9–1 (1)
|David Kozma
|Decision (unanimous)
|OKTAGON 24
|
|align=center|5
|align=center|5:00
|Brno, Czech Republic
|
|-
|Win
|align=center|25–8–1 (1)
|Alex Lohoré 
|Decision (split)
|OKTAGON 21
|
|align=center|3
|align=center|5:00
|Brno, Czech Republic
|
|-
|Win
|align=center|24–8–1 (1)
|Robert Bryczek
|Decision (unanimous)
|OKTAGON 15
|
|align=center|3
|align=center|5:00
|Prague, Czech Republic
|
|-
|Loss
|align=center|23–8–1 (1)
|Maxim Shvets
|Decision (unanimous)
|ProFC 65
|
|align=center|3
|align=center|5:00
|Rostov on Don, Russia
|
|-
|Win
|align=center|23–7–1 (1)
|Tilek Mashrapov
|KO/TKO
| Titan FC 52: Soares vs. Uruguai
|
|align=center|2
|align=center|4:39
|Ft. Lauderdale, Florida, USA
|
|-
|Win
|align=center|22–7–1 (1)
|Paulo Bananada
|Decision (unanimous)
|Kumite 1 League
|
|align=center|3
|align=center|5:00
|Mumbai, India
|
|-
|Loss
|align=center|21–7–1 (1)
|Ali Bagov
|Decision (unanimous)
|ACB 80: Tumenov vs. Burrell 
|
|align=center|3
|align=center|5:00
|Krasnodar, Russia
|
|-
| Win
| align=center| 21–6–1 (1)
| Islam Makoev 
| Decision (unanimous)
| |ACB 73: Silva vs. Makoev 
| 
| align=center|3
| align=center|5:00
| Rio de Janeiro, Brazil
|
|-
|Loss
|align=center|20–6–1 (1) 
| Joshua Aveles
|Decision (unanimous)
|ACB 65: Silva vs. Agnaev
|
|align=center|3
|align=center|5:00
|Sheffield, England
|
|-
|Win
|align=center|20–5–1 (1) 
| Pat Healy
| TKO (punches)
| |ACB 51: Silva vs. Torgeson
| 
| align=center| 1
| align=center| 0:38
| Irvine, California, United States
|
|-
|Loss
|align=center|19–5–1 (1) 
|Rustam Khabilov
|Decision (unanimous)
|UFC Fight Night: Arlovski vs. Barnett
|
|align=center|3
|align=center|5:00
|Hamburg, Germany
|
|-
|Loss
|align=center|19–4–1 (1)
|Jason Saggo
|Decision (split)
|UFC Fight Night: MacDonald vs. Thompson
|
|align=center|3
|align=center|5:00
|Ottawa, Ontario, Canada
|
|-
|Win
|align=center| 19–3–1 (1)
|Efrain Escudero 
|Decision (unanimous)
|The Ultimate Fighter Latin America 2 Finale: Magny vs. Gastelum
|
|align=center|3
|align=center|5:00
|Monterrey, Mexico
|  
|-
|Win
|align=center| 18–3–1 (1)
|Lewis Gonzalez
|Decision (unanimous)
|UFC Fight Night: Machida vs. Romero
|
|align=center|3
|align=center|5:00
|Hollywood, Florida, United States
|
|- 
| NC
| align=center| 17–3–1 (1)
| Drew Dober
| NC (overturned)
| UFC Fight Night: Maia vs. LaFlare
| 
| align=center| 2
| align=center| 2:45
| Rio de Janeiro, Brazil
| 
|-
| Win
| align=center| 17–3–1
| Charlie Brenneman
| Submission (rear-naked choke)
| UFC Fight Night: Shogun vs. Saint Preux
| 
| align=center| 1
| align=center| 4:15
| Uberlândia, Brazil
| | 

|-
| Loss
| align=center| 16–3–1
| Francisco Trinaldo
| Decision (unanimous)
| UFC Fight Night: Bigfoot vs. Arlovski
| 
| align=center| 3
| align=center| 5:00
| Brasília, Brazil
| 
|-
| Win
| align=center| 16–2–1
| Gilson Lomanto
| TKO (front kick and punches)
| MMASH: MMA Super Heroes 5
| 
| align=center| 1
| align=center| 3:50
| São Paulo, Brazil
| 
|-
| Win
| align=center| 15–2–1
| Lindeclecio Oliveira Batista
| Submission (guillotine choke)
| MMASH: MMA Super Heroes 4
| 
| align=center| 3
| align=center| 0:25
| São Paulo, Brazil
| 
|-
| Win
| align=center| 14–2–1
| Yoshiaki Takahashi
| Decision (unanimous)
| Pancrase: 257
| 
| align=center| 3
| align=center| 5:00
| Yokohama, Japan
| 
|-
| Win
| align=center| 13–2–1
| Carlos Leal Miranda
| Decision (unanimous)
| Talent MMA Circuit 5: Campinas 2013
| 
| align=center| 3
| align=center| 5:00
| São Paulo, Brazil
| 
|-
| Win
| align=center| 12–2–1
| Wilson Teixeira Nascimento
| Submission (rear-naked choke)
| Bitetti Combat 16
| 
| align=center| 2
| align=center| 3:32
| Rio de Janeiro, Brazil
| 
|-
| Loss
| align=center| 11–2–1
| Ildemar Alcântara
| Decision (unanimous)
| UFC on Fuel TV: Nogueira vs. Werdum
| 
| align=center| 3
| align=center| 5:00
| Fortaleza, Brazil
|
|-
| Win
| align=center| 11–1–1
| Chris Wilson
| Decision (split)
| Predador FC 23
| 
| align=center| 3
| align=center| 5:00
| São José do Rio Preto, Brazil
| 
|-
| Win
| align=center| 10–1–1
| Gilmar Dutra Lima
| Decision (unanimous)
| NCF: Nitrix Champion Fight 12
| 
| align=center| 3
| align=center| 5:00
| Blumenau, Brazil
| 
|-
| Win
| align=center| 9–1–1
| Franklin Jensen
| Decision (unanimous)
| NCF: Nitrix Champion Fight 11
| 
| align=center| 3
| align=center| 5:00
| Joinville, Brazil
| 
|-
| Win
| align=center| 8–1–1
| Celso Bezerra
| Submission (rear-naked choke)
| The Coliseum 1
| 
| align=center| 1
| align=center| 2:02
| Ribeirão Preto, Brazil
| 
|-
| Win
| align=center| 7–1–1
| Julio Rafael Rodrigues
| Submission (rear-naked choke)
| Valiant FC: Valiant Fighters Championship 8
| 
| align=center| 2
| align=center| 1:29
| Porto Alegre, Brazil
| 
|-
| Draw
| align=center| 6–1–1
| Gilmar Dutra Lima
| Draw
| KMMAC: Kumite MMA Combate
| 
| align=center| 3
| align=center| 5:00
| Barueri, Brazil
| 
|-
| Win
| align=center| 6–1
| Lourenco Filho
| Submission (rear-naked choke)
| Super Power Combat
| 
| align=center| 1
| align=center| 1:27
| São Paulo, Brazil
| 
|-
| Win
| align=center| 5–1
| Marcio Alves
| Submission (rear-naked choke)
| Fight Stars
| 
| align=center| 2
| align=center| 3:03
| São Paulo, Brazil
| 
|-
| Win
| align=center| 4–1
| Deivid Santos
| Submission (arm-triangle choke)
| FHB: Full Heroes Battle 4
| 
| align=center| 1
| align=center| 3:09
| Paranaguá, Brazil
| 
|-
| Win
| align=center| 3–1
| Fernando Lima
| Technical Submission (arm-triangle choke)
| Amerad Fighter
| 
| align=center| 2
| align=center| 2:01
| São Paulo, Brazil
| 
|-
| Win
| align=center| 2–1
| Osmar Osmar
| Submission (armbar)
| Blessed Fight 2
| 
| align=center| 2
| align=center| 3:20
| São Paulo, Brazil
| 
|-
|Loss
| align=center| 1–1
| André Santos
| Decision (unanimous)
| Kawai Arena 1
| 
| align=center| 3
| align=center| 5:00
| São Paulo, Brazil
|
|-
| Win
| align=center| 1–0
| Viscardi Andrade
| Decision (unanimous)
| Beach Fight Festival
| 
| align=center| 3
| align=center| 5:00
| São Paulo, Brazil
|

Mixed martial arts exhibition record

| Loss
| align=center| 0–1
| David Vieira
| Decision (unanimous)
| The Ultimate Fighter: Brazil 2
| N/A 
| align=center| 2
| align=center| 5:00
| São Paulo, Brazil
|

See also
List of male mixed martial artists

References

External links
 
 

1985 births
Living people
Brazilian male mixed martial artists
Lightweight mixed martial artists
Welterweight mixed martial artists
Mixed martial artists utilizing Muay Thai
Mixed martial artists utilizing Brazilian jiu-jitsu
Sportspeople from São Paulo
Ultimate Fighting Championship male fighters
Brazilian practitioners of Brazilian jiu-jitsu
People awarded a black belt in Brazilian jiu-jitsu
Brazilian Muay Thai practitioners